Edwin Rosa Vázquez Ortiz (born October 15, 1981), known professionally as Ñengo Flow, is a Puerto Rican rapper and singer. He was born in the Río Piedras district of San Juan and grew up in Bayamón where he started in the music business. At the age of 14, Ortiz first presented on stage in the neighborhood where he lived in a community movement.

Ñengo Flow is one of the wealthiest reggaeton artists and had a net worth of $8 million in 2017.

Singing career 
After a few years, Ortiz became known as Ñengo Flow. His first work as an artist was to release a mixtape with colleagues and friends. He then released his first studio album Flow Callejero in 2005. He continued to release mixtapes including El Combo Que No Se Deja in 2007 and La Verdadera Calle in 2010. He also appeared on various reggaetón compilation albums including Los Anormales (2004), Sangre Nueva (2005) and DJ Joe – Abusando del Género (2006). In 2011, he launched his álbums Real G4 Life and in 2012 Real G4 Life 2 as well as Real G4 Life 2.5. Real G4 Life 2 reached number 75 on the Billboard Top Latin Albums chart while the 2.5 edition reached number 61 on the same chart. Also in 2012, he appeared on various artists' albums, including Ivy Queen's Musa while also providing uncredited vocals to the song "La Killer".

Ñengo Flow's Real G4 Life concert was nominated for Concert of the Year by the Tu Música Urban Awards in 2019.

Discography

Studio albums 
 2005: Flow Callejero
 2011: Real G 4 Life
 2012: Real G 4 Life 2
 2012: Real G 4 Life 2.5
 2017: Real G 4 Life 3
 2020: The Goat

Other albums 
 2008: El Combo Que No Se Deja
 2015: Los Reyes Del Rap (con Los G4)

References

External links 
 
 

1981 births
Living people
21st-century Puerto Rican male singers
Puerto Rican reggaeton musicians
People from Río Piedras, Puerto Rico